WD repeat domain phosphoinositide-interacting protein 4 (WIPI-4) is a protein that in humans is encoded by the WDR45 gene. Mutations in this gene cause a distinct form of Neurodegeneration with brain iron accumulation (NBIA) called Beta-propeller protein-associated neurodegeneration (BPAN).

Function 
WIPI-4 is a member of the WD repeat protein family. WD repeats are minimally conserved regions of approximately 40 amino acids typically bracketed by gly-his and trp-asp (GH-WD), which may facilitate formation of heterotrimeric or multiprotein complexes. Members of this family are involved in a variety of cellular processes, including cell cycle progression, signal transduction, apoptosis, and gene regulation. 

This gene WDR45 has a pseudogene at chromosome 4q31.3. Multiple alternatively spliced transcript variants encoding distinct isoforms have been found for this gene, but the biological validity and full-length nature of some variants have not been determined.

Role in disease 
De novo loss of function mutations in WDR45 were identified by exome sequencing in 20 patients with progressive neurodegeneration and evidence of iron on brain MRI scans. The mutations cause an X-linked dominant form of NBIA now called Beta-propeller protein-associated neurodegeneration (BPAN). A name for the disease before the gene was identified was called static encephalopathy of childhood with neurodegeneration in adulthood (SENDA), though this term is no longer used. There are no current treatments for BPAN, though medications and therapies can be used to treat symptoms.

See also 
 WIPI protein family

References

Further reading